Die Chefin is a German crime drama television series starring Katharina Böhm as First Police Chief Inspector Vera Lanz, a Munich police detective who has to balance her professional and private life. The show premiered on 24 February 2012 on ZDF.

Plot
Vera Lanz is First Police Chief Inspector of the Homicide division in Munich. After the mysterious death of her husband, a fellow inspector, Vera raises her daughter Zoe alone. Successful in her professional life, Vera struggles personally as she's having an affair with the married state's attorney. Her co-worker, Police Chief Inspector Paul Böhmer, is the former partner of her late husband, which provides tension between the investigators. In the first episode, Jan Trompeter completes Vera's team.

Characters

Main
First Police Chief Inspector Vera Lanz (Katharina Böhm) is working for the homicide division in Munich, having lost her husband in a mysterious death. She's a strong and respected woman in her professional life, while struggling in her personal life.

Police Chief Inspector Paul Böhmer (Jürgen Tonkel) is the former partner of Vera's husband. Even though he seems very loyal and even protective of Vera, there exists a lot of tension between them.

Police Inspector Jan Trompeter (Stefan Rudolf) is the new colleague of Vera and Paul, who's very good as his job and seems to have caught the eye of his boss.

Recurring
Medical Examiner Heike Steinbeck (Nicole Marischka) works in the coroner's office; she is a friend of Vera.

State Attorney Marc Berger (Stephan Kampwirth) is involved in Vera's professional and private life. Even though he's married, Marc has an affair with Vera.

Zoe Lanz (Olga von Luckwald) is Vera's teenage daughter, who's about to finish school and plans to move in together with her boyfriend.

Georg Lanz (Hermann Beyer) is the father of Vera's late husband and is still investigating his son's mysterious death.

Episodes

Season 1 (2012)

Production
Filming for the first season, for which the ZDF network ordered four episodes, started on 31 May 2011 and wrapped up on 8 August 2011. Intentionally planned for Saturday nights, Die Chefin became part of the network's famous Friday night line-up, with many crime dramas like Der Alte or Ein Fall für zwei. Die Chefin is the first Friday night crime drama that revolves around a female investigator.

Reception
Die Chefin was positively received by critics. Der Spiegel wrote that Böhm could "believably show the balance between a successful inspector and a struggling woman". The online magazine Quotenmeter gave the show 80 out of 100 and wrote that "the opposing team of investigators can claim all sympathy".

References

External links
 

German crime television series
2010s German police procedural television series
2020s German police procedural television series
German drama television series
ZDF original programming
Television shows set in Munich
2012 German television series debuts
German-language television shows